In cricket, a five-wicket haul (also known as a "five–for" or "fifer") refers to a bowler taking five or more wickets in a single innings. A five-wicket haul on debut is regarded by  critics as a notable achievement. As of July 2022, 161 cricketers have taken a five-wicket haul on Test match debut, out of which nine are from the India national cricket team. The five-wicket hauls were taken against four different opponents – three each against Australia and West Indies, twice against England, and once Pakistan. The nine occasions have resulted in five wins, two losses and two draws. The five-wicket hauls were taken at eight different venues, six in India, three of which were taken at the M. A. Chidambaram Stadium, Chennai.

The first Indian to take a five-wicket haul was Mohammad Nissar who took 5 wickets for 93 runs during India's first Test, in June 1932 against England. Vaman Kumar, a leg spinner, was the next to achieve this feat. His figures of 5 wickets for 64 runs took India close to winning a match against Pakistan during the latter's tour of India in 1960–61. In December 1967, Syed Abid Ali took 6 wickets for 55 runs against Australia. The figures remain the best by an Indian fast bowler on debut. Narendra Hirwani's 8 wickets for 61 runs against the West Indies, in January 1988, are the best bowling figures by an Indian on Test debut. His aggregate of 16 wickets for 136 runs in the match are a record for any bowler on debut. As of February 2021, he is the only Indian cricketer to take ten or more wickets in a Test match on debut.

The most recent Indian cricketer to achieve this feat was Axar Patel, who took 5 wickets for 60 runs against England in February 2021. India won the match by 317 runs. Nissar, Ali and Shami are the only fast bowlers to achieve this feat, with rest of the six being spin bowlers.

Key

Five-wicket hauls

Notes

References

India
Lists of Indian cricketers